Kordabad (also Romanized as Kordābād, Kard Ābād, and Kerdābād) is a village in Jabal Rural District, Kuhpayeh District, Isfahan County, Isfahan Province, Iran. At the 2006 census, its population was 88, in 28 families.

References 

Populated places in Isfahan County